XHAL-FM is a radio station on 97.7 FM in Manzanillo, Colima. The station is known as Fórmula Manzanillo 97.7.

History
XEAL-AM 860 got its start with a concession awarded to José Olalde Soria in 1957. It moved to FM after being authorized to do so in March 2011.

References

Radio stations in Colima